Jailma Sales de Lima (born 31 December 1986 in Taperoá, Paraíba is a Brazilian track and field hurdler.

Career
At the 2012 Summer Olympics, she competed in the Women's 400 metres hurdles and the 4 x 400 metre relay.

Achievements

References

External links
 
 
 

1986 births
Living people
Brazilian female hurdlers
Olympic athletes of Brazil
Athletes (track and field) at the 2012 Summer Olympics
Athletes (track and field) at the 2016 Summer Olympics
Pan American Games silver medalists for Brazil
Pan American Games medalists in athletics (track and field)
South American Games gold medalists for Brazil
South American Games medalists in athletics
Athletes (track and field) at the 2011 Pan American Games
Competitors at the 2006 South American Games
Medalists at the 2011 Pan American Games